Amblyseius alpinia is a species of mite in the Phytoseiidae family. It is endemic to Taiwan.

References

alpinia
Animals described in 1983
Arthropods of Taiwan
Endemic fauna of Taiwan